Greg Gary (born February 14, 1970) is an American head college basketball coach for the Mercer Bears men's basketball team. He is the former head men's basketball coach at Centenary College of Louisiana.  He replaced Rob Flaska. He was born in Anderson, Indiana.

Gary graduated from Highland High School, Anderson, IN, in 1988 and went on to play college basketball at Tulane University from 1989 to 1992 after spending one year at Aquinas College. He helped lead Tulane to an NCAA Tournament appearance in 1992 and graduated as the school's all-time assist leader.

In May 2011, Gary returned to Indiana as an assistant coach at Purdue University in West Lafayette. He was hired as the head basketball coach at Mercer University on March 26, 2019.

Gary is married (Claudia Gary) and has four daughters (Gabrielle, Logan, Alex, Brooklyn) and a son, Nash.

Head coaching record

References

1970 births
Living people
American men's basketball coaches
American men's basketball players
Basketball coaches from Indiana
Basketball players from Indiana
Centenary Gentlemen basketball coaches
College men's basketball head coaches in the United States
Duquesne Dukes men's basketball coaches
McNeese Cowboys basketball coaches
Mercer Bears men's basketball coaches
Miami Hurricanes men's basketball coaches
Point guards
Purdue Boilermakers men's basketball coaches
South Florida Bulls men's basketball coaches
Sportspeople from Anderson, Indiana
Tulane Green Wave men's basketball coaches
Tulane Green Wave men's basketball players